Orthopedics is a monthly peer-reviewed medical journal covering adult and pediatric orthopedic surgery and treatment. It was established in 1978 and is published by Slack.

History
The journal was established as a bimonthly journal in 1978 with H. Andrew Wissinger as founding editor-in-chief. The current editor-in-chief is Robert D'Ambrosia.

Abstracting and indexing
The journal is abstracted and indexed in:

According to the Journal Citation Reports, the journal has a 2017 impact factor of 1.463.

References

External links

Monthly journals
English-language journals
Orthopedics journals
Publications established in 1978